Marc Fortier (born February 26, 1966) is a Canadian former ice hockey centre.  Fortier played in the National Hockey League for the Quebec Nordiques, Ottawa Senators and Los Angeles Kings.

Biography
Fortier was raised in Windsor, Quebec. As a youth, he played in the 1978 Quebec International Pee-Wee Hockey Tournament with a minor ice hockey team from Windsor.

Fortier first played four years in the QMJHL for the Chicoutimi Saguenéens. In his last season, he had a total of 201 points which is a record in team history. Afterwards, he played in the NHL, AHL and IHL. From 1994 to 2005, Fortier played in Europe, playing in the Deutsche Eishockey Liga in Germany and in Switzerland in Nationalliga A and Nationalliga B. Fortier played a total of 212 regular season games, scoring 42 goals and 102 points with 135 penalty minutes.

Fortier has been the coach and general manager of the Saint-Georges CRS Express of the Ligue Nord-Américaine de Hockey. He was a QMJHL scout for the Colorado Avalanche in the 2008–2009 season. In 2010, he served the recruitment director of the Quebec Major Junior Hockey League. He was the general manager of his former junior team, the Chicoutimi Saguenéens, from 2011 to 2014.

Career statistics

Coaching statistics
Coaching statistics.
Season  Team                    Lge  Type       GP  W  L T OTL    Pct Result 
2005-06 St. Georges CRS Express LNAH Head Coach 56 24 29 0   3  0.455 Out of Playoffs
2007-08 Québec Assur-Expert  LHJAAAQ Head Coach 54                    Semi-Final

References

External links

1966 births
Living people
Canadian ice hockey centres
Chicoutimi Saguenéens (QMJHL) players
Eisbären Berlin players
Frankfurt Lions players
Fredericton Express players
Halifax Citadels players
HC Ajoie players
HC Fribourg-Gottéron players
Sportspeople from Sherbrooke
Los Angeles Kings players
New Haven Senators players
Ottawa Senators players
People from Windsor, Quebec
Phoenix Roadrunners (IHL) players
Quebec Nordiques players
Undrafted National Hockey League players
ZSC Lions players
Ice hockey people from Quebec
Canadian expatriate ice hockey players in Germany